Asterolasia grandiflora is a species of weak, open shrub or sub-shrub that is endemic to the southwest of Western Australia. It has oblong, elliptical or egg-shaped leaves and pink to mauve flowers arranged in umbels of about three flowers with a thick covering of star-shaped hairs on the back of the petals.

Description
The upper surface of the leaves has star-shaped hairs when young but the lower surface is densely covered with star-shaped hairs. There are between twelve and twenty-four stamens.

Taxonomy
This species was first formally described in 1863 by William Jackson Hooker who gave it the name Phebalium grandiflorum and published the description in Icones Plantarum. In 1863, George Bentham changed the name to Asterolasia grandiflora, publishing the change in Flora Australiensis.

Distribution and habitat
Asterolasia grandiflora grows on breakaways and hills mostly between Toodyay and York in Western Australia.

Conservation status
Asterolasia grandiflora is classified as "Priority Four" by the Government of Western Australia Department of Parks and Wildlife, meaning that is rare or near threatened.

References

grandiflora
Rosids of Western Australia
Plants described in 1863
Taxa named by William Jackson Hooker